Nemophas helleri is a species of beetle in the family Cerambycidae. It was described by Hauser in 1904. It is known from Moluccas.

References

helleri
Beetles described in 1904